Greensboro Airport may refer to:
 Piedmont Triad International Airport, an airport in Greensboro, North Carolina.
 Greensboro North Airport, an airport also located in Greensboro, North Carolina.
 Greensboro Municipal Airport, an airport in Greensboro, Alabama.